The Northern Circuit is a court circuit in England. It dates from 1176 when Henry II sent his judges on circuit to do justice in his name. The Circuit encompassed the whole of the North of England but in 1876 it was divided. That part to the west of the Pennines retained the old name. The land to the east became the territory of the newly formed North Eastern Circuit. The two circuits have maintained strong links.

The Northern Circuit stretches from Carlisle in Cumbria at its northernmost point, running through Lakeland to the port of Whitehaven in the West, on through Preston and Burnley in Lancashire to Manchester, Liverpool and Chester.

In 1876, 62 members of the Bar had chambers on the circuit. There were 29 in Liverpool, 32 in Manchester and 1 solitary practitioner in Preston.  Today the circuit has a membership of some 1100 barristers of whom about 77 are Queen's Counsel, practising from chambers in Manchester, Liverpool, Preston and Chester. They follow on from a long line of Counsel who have become household names such as F. E. Smith (later to become Lord Birkenhead), Lord Shawcross QC (Leading Counsel at the Nuremberg Trials after World War II) and George Carman QC.

There have been other Circuiteers who have attained fame outside the law – the author John Buchan, W. S. Gilbert and James Boswell, the biographer of Dr. Samuel Johnson. Boswell was Junior of the Circuit. Since 1876 the Circuit which presently comprises 10 per cent of the Bar has produced the following judges:

  President of the Supreme Court  1
Lord Chancellors  3 
Law Lords 7 
Lord Chief Justices 3 
 President of Queen's Bench Division 1
Master of the Rolls 3 
Presidents, Probate, Divorce & Admiralty 5 
 Senior President of Tribunals  1
Lords Justice of Appeal 28 
Lady Justice of Appeal 2 
High Court Judges 92

During 2001, one Law Lord, three Lord Justices of Appeal (including the Vice President of the Court of Appeal, Criminal Division), one Lady Justice of Appeal and 12 High Court Judges were members of the Northern Circuit. In 1994, of the five female High Court Judges, four were Northern Circuiteers. Rose Heilbron QC was the first female High Court judge from the Circuit, 20 years earlier.

See also
Assizes#Circuits
Circuit court#England and Wales
Crown Court#Circuits

References
"The Northern Circuit" (1915) 138 The Law Times 301 (30 January 1915)
J S Cockburn, "The Northern Assize Circuit" (1968) 3 Northern History 118 Taylor and Francis
Northern Circuit Directory 1876–2004 with supplement to mid 2016 by His Honour Dr David Lynch
Lewin's Crown Cases on the Northern Circuit. (Gregory Alnutt Lewin. A Report of Cases Determined on the Crown Side on the Northern Circuit. S Sweet. Chancery Lane, London. 1834. Google Books.)
Observations on the Proposed Dismemberment of the Northern Circuit. Saunders and Benning. Fleet Street, London. 1843. Google Books.

English law
1176 establishments in England